The 31st PMPC Star Awards for Television ceremony was held at the Henry Lee Irwin Theater in Ateneo de Manila University, Quezon City on November 12, 2017 and was broadcast over ABS-CBN on November 19, 2017 (on Sunday's Best). The ceremony is hosted by Ruffa Gutierrez, Richard Gutierrez, Robi Domingo and Jodi Sta. Maria with Ronnie Liang, Jason Dy, Kris Lawrence, Radha Cuadrado and Jessa Zaragoza performs the theme songs of the Best Drama Series nominees in an opening number; Elmo Magalona, Janella Salvador and BoybandPH performs the Boy band songs in a sing and dance number; and Vina Morales and The CompanY performs in a tribute number for the Ading Fernando Lifetime Achievement Award to Vic Sotto. The awards night is directed by Bert de Leon.

Nominees and Winners 
Here is the full set of nominees (in alphabetical order) and winners of the 31st PMPC Star Awards for Television.

Winners are listed first and highlighted with boldface.

Stations

Programs

Personalities

Rundown
Number of Nominees

Number of Winners (excluding Special Awards)

Special awards

Ading Fernando Lifetime Achievement Awardee 
Vic Sotto

Excellence in Broadcasting Awardee 
Martin Andanar

German Moreno Power Tandem Award 
 "JoshLia" (Joshua Garcia and Julia Barretto)
 "RocSan" (Rocco Nacino and Sanya Lopez)

Faces of the Night 
 Robi Domingo (Male)
 Ali Forbes (Female)

Stars of the Night 
 Richard Gutierrez (Male)
 Jessa Zaragoza (Female)

Longest Running Daytime Drama Anthology 
Maynila (GMA 7)

See also 
PMPC Star Awards for TV
2017 in Philippine television

References 

PMPC Star Awards for Television
2017 in Philippine television